Middlemarch is a small town in the Otago region of New Zealand's South Island. It lies at the foot of the Rock and Pillar Range of hills in the broad Strath-Taieri valley, through which flows the middle reaches of the Taieri River. Since local government reorganisation in the late 1980s, Middlemarch and much of the Strath-Taieri has been administered as part of Dunedin city, the centre of which lies some 80 km to the southeast. Middlemarch is part of the Taieri electorate (formerly known as Dunedin South), and is currently represented in parliament by  Ingrid Leary. Middlemarch has reticulated sewerage but no reticulated water supply. A description of 1903, that "[T]he summer seasons are warm, but not enervating, and the winters cold, but dry" is still true today.

It is a crucial service town for the local farming community, the terminus of the Taieri Gorge Railway, and the start of the Otago Central Rail Trail.

Several suggestions exist about how the township was named. One is that Mrs Alice Humphreys (née Hawdon, 1848–1934), whose husband Edward Wingfield Humphreys owned and had surveyed for sale sections in this new township, named the town in 1876 after George Eliot's novel Middlemarch: A Study of Provincial Life. Another is that the name is from the now obsolete English term "march" meaning a boundary - in this case a middle area between two rivers. As with many places in and close to the Maniototo area, its name may have been influenced by the Northumberland ancestry of early surveyor John Turnbull Thomson (there is a Middle March region in Northumberland, centred on the town of Otterburn).

Demographics
Middlemarch is described by Statistics New Zealand as a rural settlement. It is part of the much larger Strath Taieri statistical area.

Middlemarch had a population of 153 at the 2018 New Zealand census, a decrease of 3 people (-1.9%) since the 2013 census, and a decrease of 12 people (-7.3%) since the 2006 census. There were 66 households. There were 81 males and 72 females, giving a sex ratio of 1.12 males per female. The median age was 50.2 years (compared with 37.4 years nationally), with 21 people (13.7%) aged under 15 years, 18 (11.8%) aged 15 to 29, 90 (58.8%) aged 30 to 64, and 30 (19.6%) aged 65 or older.

Ethnicities were 96.1% European/Pākehā and 21.6% Māori (totals add to more than 100% since people could identify with multiple ethnicities).

Although some people objected to giving their religion, 62.7% had no religion and 31.4% were Christian.

Of those at least 15 years old, 12 (9.1%) people had a bachelor or higher degree, and 30 (22.7%) people had no formal qualifications. The median income was $25,200, compared with $31,800 nationally. The employment status of those at least 15 was that 51 (38.6%) people were employed full-time, 21 (15.9%) were part-time, and 6 (4.5%) were unemployed.

Education
The school opened in 1880, and was initially a high school. It became a full primary in 1975.

References

Further reading

External links

 The Encyclopaedia of New Zealand, Te Ara, information on Middlemarch on its pages about Strath Taieri and Maniototo.
 The official Middlemarch website.

Geography of Dunedin
Populated places in Otago